Allègre is a commune in the Haute-Loire department in south-central France.

Population

Sights
 Château d'Allègre: ruined castle, protected since 1935 as a monument historique

Personalities
Germaine Tillion (30 May 1907 – 19 April 2008), French anthropologist, was born in Allègre.

See also
Claude Allègre
Communes of the Haute-Loire department

References

External links
Official Web site

Communes of Haute-Loire
Auvergne